Daniel J. Hilferty (born 1956) is an American business executive who served as chief executive officer of Independence Blue Cross. Hilferty was named CEO of Independence Blue Cross in 2010, which serves 9 million customers nationwide. He retired on December 31, 2020. Hilferty will continue to serve in an advisory capacity through the end of 2022. Prior to 2010, he had been president and chief executive officer of the AmeriHealth Mercy Family of Companies.

Hilferty grew up in Ocean City, New Jersey and graduated in 1974 from St. Augustine Preparatory School, which recognized him in 2014 with its Gregor Mendel medal in recognition of his career accomplishments and philanthropy. Hilferty earned a Bachelor of Science degree at Saint Joseph's University in Accounting in 1978 and was awarded a Master of Public Administration degree from American University. Hilferty had received an offer of a $22,000-a-year position at Electronic Data Systems after completing his graduate degree in 1981, but turned it down in favor of a spot at Misericordia Hospital.

Hilferty worked with the Jesuit Volunteer Corps in a volunteer program improving city playgrounds in Portland, Oregon and came to the realization that he "was a pretty good leader" based on his ability to accomplish his goals by managing his resources and connecting with government officials.

From 1987 to 1990, Hilferty was the assistant vice president overseeing community and media relations for Saint Joseph's University. From 1990 to 1992, Hilferty was the executive director of PennPorts in the administration of Governor of Pennsylvania Robert P. Casey, where he oversaw development aspects of the commonwealth's ports in Erie, Philadelphia and Pittsburgh. In 1994, Hilferty ran unsuccessfully as one of 8 candidates seeking the Democratic Party nomination as Lieutenant Governor of Pennsylvania.

In a 2013 interview, Hilferty said that he would have delayed implementation of the Patient Protection and Affordable Care Act by a year to allow better coordination between stakeholders that would allow for a better result. He also advocated for broader expansion of Medicaid in all states and suggested that appropriate penalties were needed to ensure that all individuals had health insurance that would be available to them at a wide range of price points and coverage.

On February 14, 2023, Hilferty was named the new CEO of Comcast Spectacor.

Personal
He lives with his wife and five children in Ardmore, Pennsylvania and maintains a summer home on the Jersey Shore in Ocean City, where he grew up.

References

Living people
1956 births
American University School of Public Affairs alumni
Pennsylvania Democrats
People from Ardmore, Pennsylvania
People from Ocean City, New Jersey
Saint Joseph's University alumni
St. Augustine Preparatory School alumni